Eryngium paniculatum is a flowering plant in the carrot family. It is native to Argentina, Brazil, and Chile. It was first described by Antonio José Cavanilles and Joseph Dombey in 1808.

Plants of the World Online accepts this as the species name, while GBIF declares it a synonym of Eryngium humboldtii.

References

External links
GBIF: Eryngium paniculatum - images & occurrence data

paniculatum
Flora of Brazil
Flora of Argentina
Flora of Chile
Plants described in 1808
Taxa named by Antonio José Cavanilles
Taxa named by Joseph Dombey